The following is a list of institutions that have an Islamic or Muslim identity or charter. One of the new institute is Islamic Educational Hub.

Historical institutions in continuous operations

Institutions founded before the colonial era and which are still in operation:
 Jamiatur Raza, Bareilly, UP, India

 Darul Uloom Deoband

 Jamia Ahmadiyya Sunnia Kamil Madrasa

 Darul Uloom Nadwatul Ulama

 University of Al-Qarawiyyin, Morocco, the oldest existing, continually operating and the first degree awarding educational institution in the world according to UNESCO and Guinness World Records.
 Al-Azhar University, Cairo
 Al Jamiatul Ashrafia, Azamgarh India
 Manzar-e-Islam, Bareilly city India
 Al-Mustansiriya University, Baghdad
 Al-Nizamiyya of Baghdad
 Aliah University, Kolkata, West Bengal
 Jamia Hashmia, Bijapur, India
 Jamia Nizamia, HYD, India
 Baqiyat Salihat Arabic College, Velloor, India
 Nizamiyya
 University of Ez-Zitouna, Tunis, Tunisia

Seminaries

Colonial era
Institutions of religious educations (most are classified as "madrasas", a term that means "school" or, literally, "place where lessons are given") founded during colonial era:

 Jamia Nizamia, Hyderabad, India

Post-colonial era
Religious institutions (or madrasas) founded since the end of colonial rule in the respective countries:
 Jamiatur Raza , Bareilly India
 Dar al-Mustafa, Tarim, Yemen
 Darul Uloom Haqqania, Akora Khattak, PAKISTAN
 Darul 'Uloom Karachi, Korangi, Karachi, PAKISTAN
 Jamia Binoria, S.I.T.E Industrial Area, Karachi, PAKISTAN
 Jamia Uloom-ul-Islamia, Allama Binori Town, Karachi, PAKISTAN
 Darul Huda Islamic University, Malappuram
 Umm al-Qura, Mecca
 Zaytuna Institute, Hayward, California, US

Non-seminaries

Colonial era
These are institutions founded during colonial era that are not religious seminaries. Most are universities with a broad charter for comprehensive education in the Muslim communities they serve.

 Aligarh Muslim University
 Jamia Millia Islamia, Delhi
 Jamia Osmania
 Sindh Madrasa-tul-Islam, Karachi, Sindh, Pakistan

Post-colonial era
Educational institutions founded since end of colonial rule that are not religious seminaries, but have an Islamic or Muslim identity or charter, or devoted to sciences and arts usually associated with Islamic or Muslim culture and history:

Afghanistan 
 Kabul University

Algeria 
 Emir Abdelkader University, Constantine

Azerbaijan 
 Baku State University

Bahrain 
 University of Bahrain
 Arabian Gulf University

Bangladesh 
 Islamic University of Technology
 Darul Ihsan University
 Dhaka University
 Jahangirnagar University
 Khulna University
 International Islamic University Chittagong
 Islamic University, Bangladesh
 Manarat International University
 University of Rajshahi
 Islamic Arabic University
Bangladesh Islami University

Bosnia and Herzegovina 
 University of Sarajevo

Burkina Faso 
 University of Ouagadougou

Brunei Darussalam 
 Universiti Brunei Darussalam
 Sultan Sharif Ali Islamic University

Chad 
 University of N'Djamena

Ivory Coast 
 University of Cocody

Egypt 
 Al-Azhar University
 Assiut University
 Minia University
 Suez Canal University
 Helwan University
 Tanta University
 Zagazig University
 Cairo University
 Mansoura University
 Minufiya University
 Ain Shams University
 Alexandria University

Ghana 
 Islamic University College, Ghana

Republic of Guinea 
 University of Conakry
 Julius Nyerere University of Kankan

Indonesia 
 Islamic University of Indonesia

 Muhammadiyah University of Magelang
 Syarif Hidayatullah State Islamic University Jakarta
 Bandung Islamic University
Muhammadiyah University of Surakarta
Muhammadiyah University of Yogyakarta
Sunan Kalijaga Islamic University
YARSI University
Nahdlatul Ulama Islamic University

India 

 Jamia Nizamia, Hyderabad, India
 Aligarh Muslim University
Al Jamiatul Ashrafia, Uttar Pradesh
Al-Jame-atul-Islamia, Raunahi
Jamia Al Barkaat Aligarh, Aligarh
Jamia Amjadia Rizvia, Ghosi
Jamiatur Raza, Bareilly
 Jamia Hamdard
 Jamia Millia Islamia
 Jamia Markaz, Kozhikode
 Manzar-e-Islam, Bareilly
Markaz Knowledge City, Kozhikode
 Darul Huda Islamic University
 Ma'din Academy, Malappuram, Kerala

Iran 
 Iran University of Medical Sciences
 Islamic Azad University
 K. N. Toosi University of Technology
 Payame Noor University (Distance Education)
 Shahid Bahonar University of Kerman
 Sharif University of Technology
 Shiraz University
 University of Tehran
 Tarbiat Moallem University
 Tehran University of Medical Sciences
 Bu-Ali Sina University
 Allameh Tabatabai University
 Gorgan University
 Ferdowsi University of Mashhad
 University of Isfahan
 Alzahra University
 Amirkabir University of Technology
 Isfahan University of Technology
 Iran University of Science and Technology

Iraq 
 University of Basrah
 University of Technology
 University of Mosul
 University of Baghdad
 Al Qadissiya University
 Kufa University
 Mustansiriyah University
 Iraqi University in Baghdad
 University of Anbar
 Babylon University

Ireland 
 Al-Mustafa Islamic Cultural Centre Ireland

Jordan 
 Al al-Bayt University
 Al-Balqa` Applied University
 Ajloun National Private University
 Al-Ahliyya Amman University
 Al-Hussein Bin Talal University
 Al-Isra University
 Al-Zaytoonah University of Jordan
 American University of Madaba
 Applied Science Private University
 German-Jordanian University
 Hashemite University
 Irbid National University
 Jordan University of Science and Technology
 Jerash Private University
 Jadara University
 Mutah University
 Petra University
 Philadelphia University
 Princess Sumaya University for Technology
 Tafila Technical University
 University of Jordan
 World Islamic Sciences and Education University
 Yarmouk University
 Zarqa Private University

Kuwait 
 Kuwait University

Kyrgyzstan 
 International University of Kyrgyzstan

Lebanon 
 Beirut Arab University
 Lebanese University

Libya 
 Al-Arab Medical University
 University of Garyounis
 Sebha University
 Seventh of April University
 Al-Tahadi University

Malaysia 
 International Islamic University Malaysia
 University of Science Malaysia
 University of Malaya
 Universiti Utara Malaysia
 University of Technology, Malaysia
 University Malaysia Sabah
 Al-Madinah International University
 Sultan Abdul Halim Mu'adzam Shah International Islamic University
 Selangor International Islamic University College
 Universiti Sains Islam Malaysia

Morocco 
 Chouaib Doukkali University
 Mohammed V University at Agdal
 Mohammed V University at Souissi
 Al Akhawayn University in Ifrane

Islamic Republic of Mauritania 
 University of Nouakchott

Republic of Mozambique 
 Eduardo Mondlane University

Netherlands 
 Islamic University of Rotterdam

Niger 
 Islamic University of Niger

Nigeria 
 Bayero University Kano
 Usman Dan Fodio University

Palestine 
 Al-Azhar University, Gaza
 An-Najah National University
 Al-Quds University
 Al-Quds Open University
 Birzeit University
 Islamic University of Gaza

Pakistan 
 Hamdard University
 University of the Punjab
 NED University of Engineering and Technology
 Quaid-i-Azam University
 Shah Abdul Latif University
 Sindh Agriculture University
 University of Sindh
 Shaheed Zulfikar Ali Bhutto Institute of Science & Technology
 University of Agriculture, Faisalabad
 University of Azad Jammu and Kashmir
 Bahauddin Zakariya University
 Gomal University
 International Islamic University, Islamabad
 Mehran University of Engineering and Technology, Jamshoro
Aleemiyah Institute of Islamic Studies
Jamia Amjadia Rizvia Karachi
Jamia Naeemia Lahore
Jamia Nizamia Ghousia Wazirabad
Jamia-tul-Madina
 Islamia University of Bahawalpur
 Minhaj International University
Al Quran Lab

Philippines 
 Jamiatu Muslim Mindanao

Qatar 
 University of Qatar

Russian Federation 
 Russian Islamic University, Kazan

Saudi Arabia 
 Islamic University of Madinah
 Umm al-Qura University
 King Saud University

Sudan 
 International University of Africa
 Sudan University of Science and Technology
University of the Holy Quran and Islamic Sciences
 University of Gezira
 Blue Nile University
 Al-Neelain University
 Kordofan University
 Sinar University
 University of Juba
 Khartoum University
 Nile Valley University
 Alzaiem Alazhari University
 Omdurman Islamic University

Senegal 
 Gaston Berger University of Saint Louis

Somalia 
 Somali National University
 Mogadishu University
 University of Somalia

Suriname 
 Anton de Kom University of Suriname

Syria 
 University of Damascus
 Tishreen University

Tunisia 
 Ez-Zitouna University

Turkey 
 Selçuk Üniversitesi
 Van Yüzüncü Yıl Üniversitesi

Uganda 
 Islamic University in Uganda

United Arab Emirates 
 Ajman University of Science and Technology
 College of Islamic and Arabic Studies
 United Arab Emirates University
 University of Sharjah

United States 
 Cordoba University Graduate School of Islamic and Social Sciences
Zaytuna College

United Kingdom 
Jamia Al-Karam

Yemen 
 Dar al-Mustafa
University of Aden
 Queen Arwa University
 Taiz University
 Sanaa University
 University of Science and Technology, Sana'a

See also 
 List of Islamic seminaries
 List of oldest universities in continuous operation
 Medieval university

References

External links

Isesco
FUMI-FUIW

 List of Best Muslim Educational Institutions in India

Islamic educational institutions, List of